The Richard and Deborah (Brough) Glaister House is a single-family home located at 402 South Walnut Street in Lansing, Michigan. It was listed on the National Register of Historic Places in 2017.

History
Richard Glaister was born in 1826 in England, and married Deborah Brough in 1847. In 1864 the Glaister family moved to Ottawa, Canada, and in 1868 moved to Detroit. Glaister worked as a stonemason, and did the stone work on Pittsburgh's Trinity Cathedral. Returning from Pittsburgh, he was hired to do the stonework for the Michigan State Capitol in Lansing.

Richard and Deborah Glaister built this house in 1876, likely from a design by architect Richard Appleyard. They raised their family here, and lived in the house until Richard's death in 1887. Deborah Glaister continued to live in the house after her husband's death.

The house served as a boardinghouse for some time. Alice Sessions purchased the home in 1966, and worked to preserve it. In 2017, it was sold to a nearby business.

Description
The Richard and Deborah Glaister House is a two-story, red brick house. It has both Queen Anne and Italianate details, including tall windows, carved stone window lintels, and highly detailed wood brackets under the eaves. It contains 14 rooms.

References

National Register of Historic Places in Ingham County, Michigan
Houses completed in 1876